In the context of comic books published by DC Comics, Artemis may refer to one of three fictional characters:

 Artemis, the Olympian goddess of the hunt
 Artemis of Bana-Mighdall, an Amazon and a supporting character of Wonder Woman
 Artemis Crock, the daughter of supervillains Sportsmaster and Huntress